Coțofenii may refer to one of two communes in Dolj County, Romania:

Coțofenii din Dos
Coțofenii din Față

See also
Coțofeni culture
Coțofana River
Coțofanca, a village in Călărași County, Romania
Coțofănești, a village in Bacău County, Romania
Coțofenești, a village in Prahova County, Romania